Penny Thomas (born 2 July 1979) is a South African submission grappler and 3rd degree Brazilian jiu-jitsu (BJJ) black belt practitioner and coach. A four-time Brazilian jiu-jitsu world champion, she is a Pan American champion, World No-Gi champion, FILA World grappling champion, Grapplers Quest world champion and ADCC Submission Wrestling world champion. Penny Thomas is considered the first BJJ black belt from the African continent.

Biography 
Penny Thomas was born on 2 July 1979 in Durban, South Africa. She started training gymnastic's from age 5 becoming part of the South African Junior Olympic team by age 12. In 2001 while training in kickboxing, Thomas was introduced to Brazilian jiu-jitsu (BJJ) by Micah Atkinson, who was practising with his brother using a set of Carlson Gracie instructional VHS tapes. At the time South Africa had no formal BJJ schools or qualified instructors. Thomas joined the handful of grapplers after Atkinson received his blue belt from Royce Gracie in London. Thomas started travelling to Brazil to train at the Gracie Humaita Academy and compete full time, giving up her job as a software developer and, together with Atkinson, opened South Africa's first Brazilian Jiu-Jitsu academy, in her garage, Nova Gen Brazilian Jiu Jitsu.

As a blue belt she won a silver medal at the 2003 Brazilian Jiu-Jitsu World Championship taking place in Rio de Janeiro, the following year she became the 2004 World Champion after winning gold in the medium-heavy division. In 2005 she became South African National Grappling Champion. After being promoted to purple belt she won the 2005 World Championship, the 2006 CBJJO World Jiu-Jitsu Cup and the 2006 Pan Jiu-Jitsu Championship. In 2006 during a trip to Hawaii, she started training full time under Luis Heredia, a 6th Degree black belt under Rickson Gracie, from whom she received all her belts. In 2007 Thomas won silver competing in the Men's Gi black belt division at the 2007 Triple Crown Aloha State BJJ Championship.

Thomas received her black belt from Heredia in 2008, becoming the first person from the African continent to receive a BJJ black belt, she then moved to San Diego to re-connect with Leticia Ribeiro, with whom she had trained in Brazil. She stayed in California for 5 years with the Gracie Humaita girls team, becoming black belt Jiu-Jitsu world champion twice, Pan American champion, world No-Gi champion and in 2007 ADCC Submission Fighting World champion. In 2012 she won the FILA world grappling championship then the following year moved back to Maui to focus on teaching. In 2019 she won silver at the IBJJF World Masters Championship.

Championships and accomplishments

Brazilian jiu-jitsu 
Main Achievements (black belt)
 2 x IBJJF World Champion (2009, 2007)
 IBJJF Pan America Champion (2007)
 IBJJF World No-Gi Champion (2007)
 2nd place IBJJF World Championship (2011, 2010, 2008)
 2nd place IBJJF Pan America Championship (2009)
 2nd place IBJJF World No-Gi Championship (2008)
 2nd place IBJJF World Masters Championship (2019)

Main Achievements (coloured belts)
 IBJJF World Champion (2005 purple, 2004 blue
 IBJJF Pan America Champion (2006 purple)
 CBJJO World Cup Champion (2006 purple)
 Gracie Worlds Champion (2006 Purple/Brown/black belt)
 2nd place IBJJF World Championship (2003 blue)
 2nd place Triple Crown Aloha State BJJ Championship (2007 black belt Men’s Division)

Grappling 
Main Achievements:
 ADCC Submission Fighting World Championship Champion (2007)
 FILA World Grappling Champion (2012)
 South African Grappling Champion (2005)
 Grapplers Quest Superfight Champion (2010 Las Vegas, 2010 Boston)
 Grapplers Quest No-Gi Champion (2009 Del Mar & LV – open weight, 2008 LV & NJ)
 2nd place ADCC Submission Fighting World Championship (2009)

Instructor lineage 
Mitsuyo Maeda > Carlos Gracie Sr. > Helio Gracie > Rickson Gracie > Luis Herédia > Penny Thomas

Notes

References 

1979 births
Living people
South African practitioners of Brazilian jiu-jitsu
People awarded a black belt in Brazilian jiu-jitsu
Female Brazilian jiu-jitsu practitioners
Sportspeople from Durban
Brazilian jiu-jitsu world champions (women)
South African submission wrestlers
ADCC Submission Fighting World Champions (women)